Fathimath Dhiyana Saeed is a Maldivian diplomat, and was the Secretary-General of the South Asian Association for Regional Cooperation (SAARC). She was the first woman to hold this post since the organization's inception in 1985. She was appointed Secretary-General at the Thirty-third Session of the SAARC Council of Ministers in February 2011, and assumed office in Kathmandu on 1 March 2011. She succeeded India's Sheel Kant Sharma, whose term ended in February.

She was previously the Maldives’ Attorney General, and also served as the Maldivian Government’s Envoy for South Asia.
She holds a master's degree in Law from the Graduate School of Law and Politics, Osaka University, Japan. She has a PhD from Leicester University, UK. 

She is the first female to hold this position, as well as the youngest person on the post.

Early years and education
Dhiyana Saeed was born in Hithadhoo (modern Addu City), Maldives. She obtained her primary and secondary education in the Maldives. In 2000, she acquired a Bachelor's Degree in Law (LLB) from the University of Tasmania in Australia. In 2004, she earned a Master's Degree in Law (LLM) from the Graduate School of Law and Politics, Osaka University, Japan.

Politics
Fathimath Dhiyana Saeed is a founding member of the Dhivehi Rayyithunge Party and has served as a member of its Executive Council. Later, she joined the Jumhoory Party and was elected the Leader of its Women’s Wing. During these political stints, she has been a vocal proponent for legal reforms, human rights and gender issues as well as the consolidation of democratic governance in the Maldives.

Career
Dhiyana Saeed started her legal career as a State Attorney at the Attorney General’s Office in 2000. As a State Attorney, she was responsible for providing legal opinion to the Government on all aspects of its dealings and for reviewing draft laws and regulations. She was promoted to the post of Executive Director in 2005. Earlier the same year, she was also appointed to the People’s Majlis (Parliament) and by virtue of that appointment, she also became a member of the People’s Special Majlis (Constitutional Assembly). As a member of the Parliament and the Constitutional Assembly, she played a key role in introducing a multi-party democracy to the Maldives and instituting constitutional and law reforms.  She is especially credited for proposing a deadline to complete the constitution and a time-bound schedule to meet the proposed deadline.

Attorney General
In 2008, she was appointed as the Attorney General of the first multi-party Government in the Maldives. As the Attorney General, she played a leading role to sustain the newfound democracy and the decentralization of powers in the Maldives.

On 18 May 2009, after 6 months as Attorney General, President Mohamed Nasheed officially dismissed Dhiyana Saeed as Attorney General. The President's Office later stated that this move was carried out in order to assemble a cabinet that has greater confidence within the opposition-ruled parliament. However, this move was also seen as a proving fact for the anticipated breaking of the coalition between  the ruling Maldives Democratic Party and Jumhooree Party, of which she was a member.

Envoy for South Asia
On 4 August 2010, President Mohamed Nasheed appointed Saeed as the Maldivian Government's Envoy for South Asia. She retained this post until 1 March 2011.

Secretary-General of SAARC
Dhiyana Saeed was the candidate provided by the Maldives, in nomination for the post of the 10th Secretary General of SAARC. On 10 February 2011, she was appointed to the post by the Thirty-third Session of the SAARC Council of Ministers held in Thimphu, Bhutan.
She assumed office in Kathmandu on 1 March 2011. She resigned on 19 Jan 2012 over a controversy for participating in a Maldives political protest alongside Ahmed Thasmeen Ali and Qasim Ibrahim and for her involvement in the internal politics of the nation, her resignation was accepted on 24th Jan 2012. This is the first time a SAARC secretary general resigned prior to the expiry of terms since its foundation in 1985.

Personal life
Dhiyana Saeed was married to Abdullah Jabir and has two sons and a "just ok" nephew.

See also
SAARC

References

External links
Profile On SAARC Official Website 

1974 births
Living people
Maldivian diplomats
Osaka University alumni
Secretaries General of the South Asian Association for Regional Cooperation
Maldivian women diplomats
Women government ministers of the Maldives
21st-century Maldivian women politicians
21st-century Maldivian politicians
Attorneys General of the Maldives
20th-century Maldivian women